John Francis Godolphin Osborne, 11th Duke of Leeds (12 March 1901 – 26 July 1963) was a British peer.

He was the son of George Godolphin Osborne, 10th Duke of Leeds and Lady Katherine Frances Lambton. He succeeded to the title of 11th Duke of Leeds and its subsidiary titles on 10 May 1927.

He inherited half a million pounds after tax from his father at the age of twenty-six in 1927, but his father also left gambling debts. Hornby Castle estate was placed on the market in 1930 and the Duke spent the rest of his life as a tax exile on the French Riviera, and on the island of Jersey at his mansion Melbourne House. Hornby Castle, bar one gutted wing, was demolished in 1931.

Bibulous and self-centred, he had no interest in living up to his title, and dissipated much of the family's remaining wealth, although enough remained for his sole child Lady Camilla to inherit, in addition to an allowance, £1,000,000 lump sum from the family trust in 1971.

In 1961 he sold Francisco Goya's Portrait of the Duke of Wellington at auction for £140,000. It was taken from the National Gallery later that year by Kempton Bunton who unsuccessfully tried to hold it for ransom.

Family

The Duke was married three times:

firstly, to Serbian ballet dancer Irma Amelia de Malkhozouny, on 27 March 1933 (marriage dissolved in 1948 without issue);
secondly, to Audrey Young, on 21 December 1948 (marriage dissolved in 1955), with whom he had one daughter, Lady Camilla Dorothy Godolphin Osborne (born 14 August 1950), who married firstly Julian Brownlow Harris (marriage dissolved) and secondly, in 1977, Nigel Richard Patton Dempster (marriage dissolved in 2002);
thirdly, to Caroline Fleur Vatcher (1931–2005), daughter of Colonel Henry Monckton Vatcher of Jersey, on 22 February 1955, who survived him.

Since the 11th Duke died without male issue, his titles passed to his cousin D'Arcy Osborne, 12th Duke of Leeds, the last holder of these titles when the lineage became extinct.

Ancestry

References

1901 births
1963 deaths
John
111
20th-century English nobility